The Arab League and European Union have shared relations since the EU's development into a more political power rather than an economic one. At the 19th summit of the Arab League in Saudi Arabia, Javier Solana attended the summit. He gave the EU's full support to the Arab League's Peace Initiative of 2002. At the summit, he addressed the Arab Leaders:

"once again we find ourselves together, the European Union and the Arab League, once again we have an opportunity to re-affirm our joint commitment to the values of civilisation that we share, more than ever Europeans and Arabs have to face common challenges, I am confident that we will find new ways to improve our cooperation"

Following this summit, he had several meetings with Palestinian President Mahmoud Abbas and the Arab League Secretary General Amr Moussa.

The real Organizational relations started in 2007, when the Arab League adopted a diplomacy of reaching out to other regional Organizations and Big Economic Partners, specially the EU, ASEAN, China, India, Japan and South American.

History 

The Arab League was created decades before the Creation of the European Union, yet the European states have played a big role in its organization. Starting with its launch, which was a British supported idea, to increase Arab-Nationalism against the Ottomans in World War I. The European states then suffered with what was called the independent movements that raged the Arab world. This occurred especially in the French Colonized Algeria, Syria, Lebanon and Morocco, and the British Colonized Iraq, Egypt, Palestine and the Kingdom of Trans-Jordan. Pan-Arabism was at its Peak under Egyptian President Gamal Abdel Nasser during the Suez Canal Crisis. Relations between the two regions started to calm after Nasser's death. By 1973, Arab-European relations were based on oil in exchange for political support.

Malta Communique 

In 2008, A Summit, held in Malta, with 49 Foreign Ministers, and representatives from 49 Countries, 27 European states, and 22 Arab states . The Summit came with a final resolution, named the Malta Communique, which discussed mostly Political relations, especially Middle East Issues such as Iraq, Lebanon, and the Gaza war. The Summit was the result of the "Malta Initiative", launched in 2005 by Foreign Minister Michael Frendo to bring together the European Union and the League of Arab States at Foreign Minister level for the first time in the history of the two organisations. This summit, often referred to as "Malta I", was followed by "Malta II", a second summit in Cairo, at the foreign minister level, between the European Union and the League of Arab States. This Second European Union-League of Arab States Foreign Affairs Ministerial Meeting issued the Cairo Declaration on 13 November 2012.

Organization comparison

References

External links 
 http://www.consilium.europa.eu/ueDocs/cms_Data/docs/pressdata/en/discours/93397.pdf
 http://findarticles.com/p/articles/mi_hb6507/is_26B_71/ai_n31311761/

European Union
European Union and third organisations
European Union relations